The United States women's national under-21 field hockey team represents the United States in international under-21 field hockey competitions. The team is controlled by the governing body for field hockey in the United States, USA Field Hockey, which is a member of the Pan American Hockey Federation (PAHF) and the International Hockey Federation (FIH).

The team's first recorded appearance was at the 1988 Pan American Junior Championship, where the team finished in second place.

The team's last appearance was in 2021, during the Pan American Junior Championship in Santiago.

History

Tournament Records

Team

Current squad
The following 18 players represented the USA at the 2021 Pan American Junior Championship in Santiago.

Caps and goals updated as of 28 August 2021 after the match against the United States.

References

External links
USA Field Hockey
FIH profile

Women's national under-21 field hockey teams
Field hockey
National team